Carole P. Meredith is an American grape geneticist and was a professor at the Department of Viticulture and Enology of University of California, Davis.

Career 
Before she retired in 2003, Meredith and her research group pioneered the use of DNA typing to differentiate Vitis vinifera grape varieties and for elucidating their parentage, which gives insight into the varieties' history and place of origin. In 1996, Meredith and her research established the parentage of Cabernet Sauvignon, which was the first application of such techniques. Later, Chardonnay, Syrah, and Zinfandel followed. The research group showed that the varieties Zinfandel, Primitivo, and Crljenak Kaštelanski are identical. The varieties Charbono and Corbeau were also found to be identical.

In 2009, she was inducted into the Vintners Hall of Fame.

Winemaking
In 1986, she moved to Napa Valley commuting to UC Davis where her husband, Steve Lagier, made wine at Robert Mondavi Winery. After her retirement from academia in January 2003, Meredith and her husband grow on 4 acres Syrah, Zinfandel, Malbec, and Mondeuse in the Mount Veeder AVA of Napa Valley under the Lagier-Meredith label. The first vines on their property were planted in 1994.

References

American viticulturists
Living people
Year of birth missing (living people)
Place of birth missing (living people)
American geneticists
21st-century American botanists
American women botanists
University of California, Davis faculty
Women botanists
20th-century American women scientists
21st-century American women scientists